Magway District is a district of the Magway Region (formerly Magway Division) in central Myanmar.

Magway may be divided into two portions: the low, flat country in the Taungdwingyi subdivision, and the undulating high ground extending over the rest of the district. In Taungdwingyi the soil is rich, loamy, and extremely fertile. On the east are the Pegu Yomas, which at some points reach a height of  A number of streams run westwards to the Irrawaddy, of which the Yin and the Pin, which form the northern boundary, are the chief. The only perennial stream is the Yanpè. Rice is the staple product, and considerable quantities are exported. Sesamum of very high quality, maize, and millet are also cultivated, as well as cotton in patches here and there over the whole district.

Townships
The district contains the following townships:
Magway Township
Yenangyaung Township
Chauck Township
Taungdwingyi Township
Myothit Township
Natmauk Township

References

Districts of Myanmar
Magway Region